Pieter Franciscus Sylvester "Frans" Otten (31 December 1895 in Berlin – 4 January 1969 in Valkenswaard) was a Dutch business executive, who served as the CEO of the international electronics firm Philips from 1939 to 1961. He was the son-in-law of the co-founder of the company, Anton Philips. He was married to Anna Elisabeth Cornelia Philips (1899-1996) and they had two sons, Diek and Franz. His brother-in-law was Frits Philips. 

The  in Amsterdam is named for him.

References

External links

1895 births
1969 deaths
Chairmen of Philips
Dutch chief executives in the manufacturing industry
Dutch chief executives in the technology industry
Dutch football chairmen and investors
Delft University of Technology alumni
People from Berlin